The Park of the Exposition (Spanish: Parque de la Exposición) is a park located in the  neighborhood of downtown Lima, capital of Peru.

History
The park was occupied by the south gate of the Walls of Lima, known as Puerta de Guadalupe. In the 1870s President José Balta ordered the demolition of these walls within its modernization plan of the city. It was planned that this location would be aimed at building a park that would house the Lima International Exhibition of 1872. Thus, alongside the park, rose the Exhibition Palace (now the Lima Art Museum).

Its design was neo-Renaissance and included the construction of pavilions including a zoo and other buildings. Leonardi also designed the Exhibition Palace. In the beginning the largest, covering the current and contemporary Park of the Reserve and the land where now stands the Estadio Nacional, were part of the park.

During the War of the Pacific, the park had a military use, before the invasion, as a garrison and a hospital and after the invasion as headquarters for the Chilean troops.

With the celebration of the centenary of the independence of Peru, Augusto B. Leguía was ordered to build several additional buildings, such as Byzantine Hall and the building that served as headquarters of the Ministry of Transport and Communications and is currently intended to be the Metropolitan Museum of Lima.

In 1961 he ordered the demolition of the Panopticon of Lima and the construction of the Civic Centre of Lima, the land north of Park of the Exposition and currently home to the Centre for Military and Historical Studies and the Museum of Italian Art that originally belonged the park, were considered part of the same.

During the 1970s, the Park of the Exposition fell into a severe decline. In the 1990s, during the administration of Alberto Andrade, the Park was restored and lakes and an amphitheater were created and the park opened to the park.  Andrade renamed the park calling it Gran Parque de Lima but it later returned to its original name.

Gallery

See also
 Palacio de la Exposición

References

Parks in Peru
World's fair sites in South America
Tourist attractions in Lima
Geography of Lima